Estadio Nuevo Colombino is a multi-purpose stadium in Huelva, Spain.  It is currently used mostly for football matches and is the home ground of Recreativo de Huelva. Football was first introduced to Spain in Huelva and it still hosts the annual Trofeo Colombino, one of the traditional curtain-raisers to the Spanish football season. With a capacity of 21,670 seats, it is the 30th-largest stadium in Spain and the 6th-largest in Andalusia. Opened in November 2001, it replaced Estadio Colombino.

Estadio Nuevo Colombino hosted a Spain international match on 15 November 2014, a European Championship Qualifying match against Belarus.

References

External links 

Estadios de Espana 

Recreativo de Huelva
Multi-purpose stadiums in Spain
Football venues in Andalusia
Buildings and structures in the Province of Huelva
Sport in Huelva
Sports venues completed in 2001